The Punjabi dialects and languages or Punjabic are a series of dialects and languages spoken around the Punjab region of Pakistan and India with varying degrees of official recognition. They have sometimes been referred to as Greater Punjabi macrolanguage. Punjabi may also be considered as a pluricentric language with more than one standard variety. 

The varieties of "Greater Punjabi"  have a number of characteristics in common, for example the preservation of the Prakrit double consonants in stressed syllables. Nevertheless, there is disagreement on whether they form part of a single language group, with some proposed classifications placing them all within the Northwestern zone of Indo-Aryan, while others reserving this only for the western varieties, and assigning the eastern ones to the Central zone alongside Hindi.

Geographic distribution 
The literary languages that have developed on the basis of dialects of this area are Standard Punjabi in eastern and central Punjab, Saraiki in the southwest, and Hindko and Pahari-Pothwari in the northwest. A distinction is usually made between Punjabi in the east and the diverse group of "Lahnda" in the west. "Lahnda" typically subsumes the Saraiki and Hindko varieties, with Jhangvi and Shahpuri intermediate between the two groups. Commonly recognised Eastern Punjabi dialects include Majhi (the standard), Doabi, Malwai, and Puadhi. The "Lahnda" variety of Khetrani in the far west may be intermediate between Saraiki and Sindhi.

Pakistan 
Punjabi, Hindko and Saraiki are listed separately in the census enumerations of Pakistan. According to the 2017 Census of Pakistan, there are 80,536,390 Standard Punjabi speakers; 25,324,637 Saraiki speakers and 5,065,879 Hindko speakers.

India 
In India, Punjabi is listed as a constitutional language and is counted in the census returns. According to the 2011 Census of India, there are 33,124,726 Punjabi speakers which includes the varieties of Bagri (1,656,588 speakers) Bilaspuri (295,805 speakers) and Bhateali (23,970 speakers). Bagri is spoken in parts of Punjab, Haryana and Rajasthan. Bilaspuri and Bhateali are spoken in Himachal Pradesh. The status of Bagri is split between Punjabi and Rajasthani in the census returns with options available under Punjabi and Rajasthani.
Gusain (1991) places Bagri as a Rajasthani dialect. Similarly, the identities of Bilaspuri and Bhateali are also split, in their case, between Punjabi and Dogri. 

Lahnda languages are only enumerated in the census returns in India with 108,791 speakers listed in the 2011 census. The varieties listed under Lahnda are Bahawalpuri (29,253 speakers); Multani  which is described as Hindi Multani (61,722 speakers) and unclassified (17,816 speakers).  Punchi is spoken in Jammu. The language variety is listed under Lahnda as it, together with Bahwalpuri and Multani satisfies the "criterion of 10,000 or more speakers at the all India level".

Historically, Dogri was considered to be a dialect of Punjabi spoken primarily in Jammu. In the 1941 Census, Dogri was listed under Punjabi. Since 2003, Dogri is listed as an independent language in the constitution of India. According to the 2011 Census - India, there are 2,596,767 Dogri speakers. Similar to Dogri, the Kangri language spoken in Himachal Pradesh was regarded as a Punjabi dialect but since 1971, it has been reclassified under Hindi. There were 1,117,342 Kangri speakers listed in the 2011 Cenus- India. Despite the independent status of Dogri and reclassification of Kangri, both languages are claimed to fall within Punjabi by some writers. Others place Dogri and Kangri within the Western Pahari group. Eberle et al (2020) believe Dogri and Kangri are related to Easterm Punjabi and place these languages in a group of related languages descended from an intermediate division of Indo-Aryan languages.

See also
 Bengali dialects
 Sindhi languages
 Hindi Belt
 Bazigar language
 Khalsa bole, coded language of Nihang Sikhs largely based on Punjabic

References

Sources

Burling, Robbins. 1970. Man's many voices. New York: Holt, Rinehart and Winston.
Ethnologue. Indo-Aryan Classification of 219 languages that have been assigned to the Indo-Aryan grouping of the Indo-Iranian branch of the Indo-European languages.
Ethnologue. Languages of India
Ethnologue. Languages of Pakistan
 Online database 

Rahman, Tariq. 2006. The role of English in Pakistan with special reference to tolerance and militancy. In Amy Tsui et al., Language, policy, culture and identity in Asian contexts. Routledge. 219-240.

Shackle, C. 1970. Punjabi in Lahore. Modern Asian Studies, 4(3):239–267. Available online at JSTOR.
 

 (requires registration)

External links
Map of Punjabi dialects from Grierson's early 20th-century Linguistic Survey of India

Languages of Punjab, Pakistan
Languages of India
Punjabi language
 
Greater Punjabi languages and dialects